Somatrogon, sold under the brand name Ngenla, is a medication for the treatment of growth hormone deficiency. Somatrogon is a glycosylated protein constructed from human growth hormone and a small part of human chorionic gonadotropin which is appended to both the N-terminal and C-terminal.

The most common side effects include reactions at the site of injection, headache, and fever.

Somatrogon was approved for medical use in Australia in November 2021, and in the European Union in February 2022.

Society and culture

Legal status 
On 16 December 2021, the Committee for Medicinal Products for Human Use of the European Medicines Agency adopted a positive opinion, recommending the granting of a marketing authorization for the medicinal product Ngenla, intended for the treatment of growth hormone deficiency in children and adolescents from three years of age. The applicant for this medicinal product is Pfizer Europe MA EEIG. Somatrogon was approved for medical use in the European Union in February 2022.

Names 
Somatrogon is the international nonproprietary name.

References

Further reading

External links 
 

Experimental drugs
Growth factors
Orphan drugs
Pfizer brands